The Civil Defence Academy of the Ministry of Emergency Situations of Russia is a state institution for the training of highly qualified specialists in the Ministry of Emergency Situations. As part of the Russian Emergencies Ministry, the academy trains troops (both officers and NCOs) for the service of the country's civil defence forces and disaster response services. It was founded in 1992 and is located in Khimki, very close to Moscow.

History 
The Academy was established as the Command Officers' Training and Enhancement Courses of the Air Defence Forces on 25 October 1933 by orders of the People's Commissariat of Defence, the date of which is marked as the anniversary of the formation of the academy. It was reorganized into the Red Army Electrical School in 1935. On 20 January 1949, the Council of Ministers reorganized it into the Republican School for Advanced Training of Officers of the Local Air Defense Units (abbreviated to the MPVO). In 1961, the MPVO was transformed into the Civil Defense of the Soviet Union, with the school being renamed to the Central Courses for Advanced Training of Officers of the Civil Defense. In October 1983, the Presidium of the Supreme Soviet awarded the Order of the Red Star to the course. On 9 December 1992, Prime Minister Yegor Gaidar established the academy in the basis of the Central Command and Control Center and the Civil Defense Courses of the RSFSR. In May 1994, the university received the name Academy of Civil Defence of the EMERCOM of Russia. Since January 2016, it has been a Federal State Budgetary Educational Institution of Higher Education.

Activities

Graduates of the academy have led the national response to civil catastrophes such as the Russian apartment bombings and the collapse of Transvaal Park. They have also provided assistance during natural disasters in Turkey, Colombia, South Ossetia, Afghanistan, Chechnya, Yugoslavia and other countries.

Organization 

During its existence, the academy has trained around 6,000 thousand highly specialists. Currently, over 2,500 people study at the academy. The academy includes: two institutes, six faculties, the Cadet Fire and Rescue Corps, twenty-seven departments, seven centers, the training fire and rescue unit, the training and sports complex, the training and experimental complex, the clinic, and the central library of the Ministry of Emergency Situations. The Academy conducts training in postgraduate and postgraduate studies. The Faculty for the Training of Foreign Specialists takes in officers and cadets of from twelve foreign countries: Abkhazia, Armenia, Azerbaijan, Belarus, Kazakhstan, Kyrgyzstan, Moldova, Mongolia, South Ossetia, Tajikistan, Uzbekistan, and Vietnam.

Institutes
 Institute for Special Training
 Institute for the Development of EMERCOM

Faculties
 Faculty of Senior Management 
 Cadet Engineering Faculty
 Faculty of Engineering
 Faculty of Humanities
 Faculty of Distance Learning
 Faculty for the Training of Foreign Specialists

Centers
 Research Center
 Educational-Methodical Center
 Center for Teaching Aids
 Logistics Support Center
 Telecommunication center
 Press Service
 Cultural, Leisure and Educational Center

Departments
 Department of Operational Management
 Department of Biomedical and Environmental Protection
 Department of Engineering Protection for the Population 
 Department of Tactics and General Military Disciplines
 Department of Rescue Operations
 Department of Radiation and Chemical Protection
 Department of Fire Safety
 Department of Rescue and Robotic Tools
 Department of Information Systems and Technologies
 Department of Information and Communication Technologies and Communication Systems
 Department of Operation of Transport-Technological Machines and Complexes
 Department of Informatics and Computer Engineering
 Department of Air Navigation and Unmanned Aircraft Systems
 Department of Economics, Management and Organization of Public Procurement
 Department of Pedagogy and Psychology
 Department of Legal Disciplines
 Department of State and Municipal Administration
 Department of Philosophy, History and Cultural Studies
 Department of Advertising and Public Relations
 Department of Economic Sustainability and Life Support Systems
 Department of Higher Mathematics
 Department of Foreign Languages
 Department of Mechanics and Engineering Graphics
 Department of Physical Training and Sports
 Department of Physics
 Department of Chemistry and Material Science
 Department of Mobilization Training

Heads
 Lieutenant General Vladilen Sychev (1994 — 2004)
 Lieutenant General Pavel Popov (2004 — 12 February 2009)
 Colonel General Sergey Shlyakov (12 February 2009 — December 2012)
 Major General Alexander Mezhov (December 2012 — 22 August 2017)
 Major General Viktor Panchenkov (22 August 2017 — present)

School traditions 

The academy maintains a cadet military band, which was founded on 1 September 1999 on the basis of a directive by Minister Sergey Shoygu on 16 July of that year. Cadets of the academy are annual participants in the Moscow Victory Day Parade on Red Square, representing all servicemen of the EMERCOM in a single parade battalion. Originally for the first time since 2002, cadets from the Civil Defense Academy of the Ministry of Emergency Situations were not to take part in the 2018 Moscow Victory Day Parade, while EMERCOM detachments continued to march past in other major parades nationwide, however, the decision was rescinded.

See also 
 Military University of the Ministry of Defense of the Russian Federation
 Moscow University of the Ministry of Internal Affairs of Russia
 Moscow Border Institute of the FSB of the Russian Federation
 University of Civil Protection of the Ministry of Emergency Situations (Belarus)

External links 
 Сайт МЧС России
 Официальный сайт ФГБВОУ ВО «Академия гражданской защиты МЧС России»
 Институт специальной подготовки 
 Институт развития МЧС России

References 

1992 establishments in Russia
Educational institutions established in 1992
Military academies of Russia
Ministry of Emergency Situations (Russia)